John Woodruff may refer to:
 John Woodruff (athlete) (1915–2007), American middle-distance runner
 John Woodruff (representative) (1826–1868), U.S. Representative from Connecticut
 John Woodruff (director) (fl. 2000s–2010s), American actor and director
 John Woodruff (talent manager) (fl.1980s–2010s), Australian talent manager, record label owner
 John I. Woodruff (1864–1962), American football coach and member of the Pennsylvania House of Representatives

See also
John Woodroffe (1865–1936), British Orientalist